|}

Vietnam women's national beach handball team (Vietnamese: Đội tuyển bóng ném bãi biển nữ quốc gia Việt Nam) is a national team of Vietnam. The team takes part in international beach handball competitions and friendly matches.

Competitions results

World Games

World Beach Games

World Championship

Asian Beach Games
  2008 — 5th Place
  2010 —   Bronze medal
  2012 —   Bronze medal
  2014 —   Bronze medal
  2016 —   Gold medal
  2023 — TBD

Asian Championship
  2004 — Did not enter
  2013 — 4th Place
  2015 —  Bronze medal
  2017 —  Silver medal
  2019 —  Silver medal
  2022 —  Gold medal
  2023 —  Gold medal

Southeast Asian Championship
  2017 —  Gold medal
  2023 — TBD

References

External links
IHF profile

Women's national beach handball teams
Women's national sports teams of Vietnam